Charlotte was a provincial electoral district for the Legislative Assembly of New Brunswick, Canada from 1994 to 2006.  It was created from large parts of Charlotte Centre and Charlotte-Fundy.  Following 2006, most of the district became part of Charlotte-The Isles

Members of the Legislative Assembly

Election results

References 
 New Brunswick Votes 2006, CBC

External links 
Website of the Legislative Assembly of New Brunswick

Former provincial electoral districts of New Brunswick